"Run Devil Run" is a 1999 original Paul McCartney composition written in a Chuck Berry style as the title track of his 1999 covers album Run Devil Run. It is one of three original songs on the 15-song album, along with "Try Not to Cry", and "What It Is", and was also released as a promotional 7" vinyl single.

Title and lyrics
The title originated from the name of a brand of bath salts or Run Devil Run oil a folk remedy to ward off evildoers which McCartney had picked up at Miller's Rexall Drugs, a hoodoo store in Atlanta. The mock up of a shop with the name "Run Devil Run" on the album cover is of Miller's Rexall Drugs, with the name altered to fit the title song. In the album press release interview prior to release of the album the interviewer asked McCartney about the genesis of the title track. McCartney answered as follows:

After continuing to describe the process of the lyrics, written while sailing, McCartney said that he himself was planning to use the Run Devil Run bath salts:

References
 Citations

Sources

 
 
 
 

1999 songs
Music published by MPL Music Publishing
Paul McCartney songs
Song recordings produced by Paul McCartney
Songs written by Paul McCartney